The 1921–22 Philadelphia F.C. season was the first season for Philadelphia F.C. and its first season in the American Soccer League. The league was originally to have included the Bethlehem Steel F.C. but, just before the season started, Bethlehem Steel dropped out of the league and was replaced by Falco F.C. The Bethlehem Steel officials disbanded the club and threw their resources behind the Philadelphia F.C. Most of the best Bethlehem Steel players were signed to Philadelphia F.C.

Philadelphia F.C. won the league, but it was the only season for the club in that incarnation. Following the season, the Philadelphia club was transferred "back" to Bethlehem and a new team was organized in Philadelphia to take its place.

American Soccer League

Pld = Matches played; W = Matches won; D = Matches drawn; L = Matches lost; GF = Goals for; GA = Goals against; Pts = Points

National Challenge Cup

Notes and references
Bibliography

Footnotes

Philadelphia F.C.
American Soccer League (1921–1933) seasons
Philadelphia F.C.